A False Start: London Poems 1959 - 1963 is a collection of poems by Peter Russell. It was published by the University of Salzburg in 1993.

English poetry collections
1993 poetry books